Cyperus algeriensis is a species of sedge that is native to Algeria in northern Africa.

See also 
 List of Cyperus species

References 

algeriensis
Plants described in 2005
Flora of Algeria